Cyber Heist, previously known as Disconnected, is a 2023 Hong Kong action thriller film directed by Danny Wong and starring Aaron Kwok as a cyber security engineer who develops an AI programme application which can potentially disable all of Hong Kong's networks. The film co-stars Gordon Lam, Simon Yam and Megan Lai.

Production for Cyber Heist took place from 12 June to 14 October 2020 and was released on 9 March 2023.

Plot
Behind the computer screens lies a mysterious web jungle displaying full of fiber optics and data, which is a fantastical space carrying technology and viruses at the same time.

Hackers release a virus to the web and unleashes a large scale cyber attack. Fortunately, cyber security engineer and IT whiz, Cheuk Ka-chun (Aaron Kwok) uses a firewall he developed to resolve the crisis. Unbeknownst to Ka-chun, the mastermind behind this virus spread is his superior, Chan Ming-chi (Gordon Lam) and Ka-chun also falls victim into a money laundering conspiracy as a result. 

To prove his innocence, Ka-chun engages in a fierce battle with Ming-chi. Ka-chun secretly develops an AI programme application super virus and sets foot into dangerous grounds to ambush and attack the hackers and swears to find evidence of Ming-chi's crimes. At the same time, Ming-chi also commands the hackers to steal Ka-chun's password-cracking software setting off a network technology crisis potentially and kidnap Ka-chun's daughter, Po-yee, while also threatening his wife, Wing-shan (Megan Lai). Ka-chun is pressured as the lives of his family are being threatened. Making matters worse, his AI super virus loses control and swiftly finds its way entering every computer in Hong Kong, leading to a public panic, and Ka-chun faces the challenge of reviving the city's network and rescuing his family from danger between life and death.

Cast
Aaron Kwok as Cheuk Ka-chun (卓家俊), a cyber security engineer and IT whiz.
Gordon Lam as Chan Ming-chi (陳明志), Ka-chun's superior and nemesis. Lam states his character will "viciously take on Kwok's character."
Simon Yam as Suen Ban (孫斌), Inspector of the Cyber Security and Technology Crime Bureau (CSTCB).
Megan Lai as To Wing-shan (杜詠珊), Ka-chun's wife.
Kenny Wong
Tony Wu
Zeno Koo
Wiyona Yeung
Julius Brian Siswojo

Guest appearance
Patrick Tam plays a character who he describes as "difficult to tell whether a friend or foe to Kwok's character."

Special appearance
Andy Kwong
Bonnie Wong
Kathy Yuen
Terry Zou

Production
Principal photography for Cyber Heist began on 12 June 2020 in Ho Man Tin. In July 2020, production was temporarily halted due to the third wave outbreak of the COVID-19 pandemic in Hong Kong before resuming in August. Due to the pandemic affecting Hong Kong's film market, Aaron Kwok reportedly commanded only 70% of his normal salary to support the industry. A high tech office set for the film costed HK$2 million to build. Production for Cyber Heist officially wrapped up on 14 October 2020 after filming its final scene in a forest in Nam Sang Wai.

Release
Cyber Heist was theatrically released on 9 March 2023 in Hong Kong.Edko Films has picked up the worldwide distribution rights for the film.  On 5 May 2022, the film released its first teaser trailer displaying a slated release date for 2022. The film later released new character posters on 19 January 2023, displaying a slated release year of 2023.

See also
Aaron Kwok filmography

References

External links
斷網 Cyber Heist on Facebook
斷網 Cyber Heist on Instagram

2023 action thriller films
Hong Kong action thriller films
2020s Cantonese-language films
Media Asia films
Malware in fiction
Films about technological impact
Films about the Internet
Films about computer hacking
Films set in Hong Kong
Films shot in Hong Kong